Borrowfield is a settlement in Aberdeenshire, Scotland in proximity to Netherley.

History
Roman legions marched from Raedykes to Normandykes Roman Camp through the passing near borrowfield as they sought higher ground to avoid the bogs of Red Moss and other low-lying mosses associated with the Burn of Muchalls. That march used the Elsick Mounth, an ancient trackways crossing the Mounth of the Grampian Mountains, lying west of Netherley.

People of Borrowfield
Patrick Tailzour was born here in the eighteenth century. The family included rich Jamaicans and Sir John Taylor, 1st Baronet.

See also
 Elsick Mounth
 Red Moss, Aberdeenshire
 Netherley House
 Muchalls Castle

References

Villages in Aberdeenshire